Lara Larramendi Blakely is a former mayor of Monrovia, California as well as numerous other governmental office positions.

Early life
Blakely was born in Santiago de Cuba, Cuba. She came to the United States as a child in 1961, and has lived in California since 1963, owning a home in Monrovia since 1975. She earned her bachelor's degree in Sociology from Cal State University Los Angeles and earned her master's degree from UCLA.

Political career
Blakely is a former mayor of Monrovia, California. She is a registered Democrat. She was elected to the Monrovia City Council in 1988 and later was reelected in 1990, 1994, and 1999. Blakely has several accomplishments, such as serving as a California State Assembly Speaker appointee to the Cost Control Performance Advisory Committee, a member of the Housing, Community, and Economic Development Policy Committee, which she later chaired from 1991–1994. She was a member of the Environmental Quality Policy Committee, and served as a representative to a number of committees including the NLC CED Policy and Steering Committee, the Joint Committee on Youth Policy, the California Affordable Housing Partnership Project, and the Los Angeles County Metropolitan Transit Authority's Special Task Force for Countywide Bicycle Policy. Blakely was also elected to the National League of Cities Board of Directors to a 2-year term in December 1994, was a past President of Women in Municipal Government, and a member of Hispanic Elected Local Officials. During her tenure as president, WIMG successfully implemented a series of workshops at the United Nations’ Beijing + 5 Follow up Conference on women in New York City in June 2000.

Personal life
Blakely has recently gotten a divorce with her husband, Michael. They currently have two children: Eric and Eryn.

References

Living people
People from Santiago de Cuba
American politicians of Cuban descent
Hispanic and Latino American mayors in California
Hispanic and Latino American women in politics
Women mayors of places in California
California Democrats
People from Monrovia, California
Cuban emigrants to the United States
California State University, Northridge alumni
University of California, Los Angeles alumni
Year of birth missing (living people)
Mayors of places in California
21st-century American women